"In the Blink of an Eye" is a song written and performed by Christian rock band, MercyMe. It is the third and final radio single released in promotion of MercyMe's 2004 studio album, Undone.

Composition

"In The Blink of an Eye" is a Christian rock song with a length of three minutes and sixteen seconds. The song is set in the key of D major and has a tempo of 116 beats per minute, with a vocal range spanning from G3-E5.

Track listing
"In The Blink Of An Eye" – 3:16 (Peter Kipley, MercyMe)

Charts

References

MercyMe songs
2004 songs
2005 singles
Songs written by Pete Kipley
Songs written by Bart Millard